Diaulula is a genus of sea slugs, dorid nudibranchs, shell-less marine gastropod molluscs in the family Discodorididae.

Species 
Species in the genus Diaulula include:

 Diaulula alba  (K. White, 1952)
 Diaulula aurila (Ev. & Er. Marcus, 1967)
 Diaulula boreopacifica Martynov, Sanamyan & Korshunova, 2015
 Diaulula cerebralis Valdes, 2001
 Diaulula farmersi Valdés, 2004
 Diaulula flindersi (Burn, 1962) 
 Diaulula greeleyi (MacFarland, 1909)
 Diaulula hispida (d'Orbigny, 1837) 
 Diaulula immaculata Valdes, 2001 
 Diaulula lentiginosa (Millen, 1982) 
 Diaulula nayarita (Ortea & Llera, 1981)
 Diaulula nivosa Valdés & Bertsch, 2010 
 Diaulula odonoghuei Steinberg, 1963 
 Diaulula phoca (Ev. Marcus & Er. Marcus, 1967) 
 Diaulula punctuolata (d'Orbigny, 1837)
 Diaulula sandiegensis (J. G. Cooper, 1863) 
 Diaulula variolata (d'Orbigny, 1837)
Species brought into synonymy
 Diaulula gigantea Bergh, 1905: synonym of Sebadoris nubilosa (Pease, 1871)
 Diaulula hummelincki (Ev. Marcus & Er. Marcus, 1963) : synonym of Discodoris hummelincki (Ev. Marcus & Er. Marcus, 1963) synonym of as Tayuva lilacina (Gould, 1852)
 Diaulula nobilis (MacFarland, 1905): synonym of Montereina nobilis MacFarland, 1905: synonym of Peltodoris nobilis (MacFarland, 1905)

References

 Valdés Á. (2002). A phylogenetic analysis and systematic revision of the cryptobranch dorids (Mollusca, Nudibranchia, Anthobranchia). Zoological Journal of the Linnean Society. 136: 535-636.

 
Discodorididae
Gastropod genera